König Palast or Kings Palace in English Language, officially Yayla Arena, is an Arena in Krefeld, Germany.  It is primarily used for ice hockey, and is the Home to the Krefeld Pinguine, Krefeld Penguins of the DEL. König Palast opened in 2004 and holds 8,029 people.

External links
Arena website

Indoor arenas in Germany
Indoor ice hockey venues in Germany
Buildings and structures in Krefeld
Sport in Krefeld
Sports venues in North Rhine-Westphalia